Love Live! School Idol Project is an anime television series produced by Sunrise in collaboration with ASCII Media Works and Lantis as part of the Love Live! franchise. The series follows a group of school girls who form an idol group in order to save their school from being shut down. The first season aired 13 episodes on Tokyo MX from January 6 to March 31, 2013. A second season aired from April 6 to June 29, 2014. Both seasons are licensed in North America by NIS America and are simulcast by Crunchyroll. An animated film, Love Live! The School Idol Movie, was released on June 13, 2015.


Episode list

Season 1

Season 2

Notes

References 

Lists of anime episodes
Love Live!